Bhaurasa is a town and a nagar panchayat in Dewas district  in the state of Madhya Pradesh, India.

Demographics
 India census, Bhaurasa had a population of 10,405. Males constitute 52% of the population and females 48%. Bhaurasa has an average literacy rate of 60%; with male literacy of 70% and female literacy of 48%. 17% of the population is under 6 years of age.20 km from Dewas.

References

Cities and towns in Dewas district